"Poles Apart" is a song by Pink Floyd from the band's 1994 album, The Division Bell.

Lyrics
The lyrics speak to ex-bandmate Syd Barrett in the first verse, and Roger Waters in the second, according to co-writer Polly Samson. As such, the second verse begins with the words "Hey you", the title of a Waters-penned song from Pink Floyd's earlier album, The Wall.

Tuning
The song was performed in DADGAD tuning.

Personnel
David Gilmour – acoustic & electric guitars, lap steel, fretless bass, lead vocals, keyboards, programming
Nick Mason – drums and percussion
Richard Wright – Hammond organ

Additional musicians:
Tim Renwick – acoustic guitar
Jon Carin – keyboards, fx

References

1994 songs
Pink Floyd songs
Songs written by David Gilmour
Songs written by Nick Laird-Clowes
Songs with lyrics by Polly Samson
Song recordings produced by Bob Ezrin
Song recordings produced by David Gilmour
Songs about Syd Barrett
Rock ballads